The 1963–64 Scottish Division One was won by Rangers by six points over nearest rival Kilmarnock. Queen of the South and East Stirlingshire finished 17th and 18th respectively and were relegated to the 1964-65 Second Division.

League table

Results

References

1
Scottish Division One seasons
Scot